This is a list of the highest known prices possibly paid for non-fungible tokens (NFTs) representing digital assets.

Background
Monetization of digital assets as NFTs became possible with the release of Etheria, on the Ethereum blockchain, in 2015. From late 2017, the NFT market grew quickly. In the first three months of 2021, NFTs worth US$200 million were traded.

One of the earliest NFT projects, CryptoPunks, has provided several of the most expensive NFTs. There were some NFT-like projects or "proto NFTs" that pre-date CryptoPunks; Rare Pepes, for example, was released on Counterparty in 2014.

List of highest prices paid
Where necessary, the price is first converted to dollars using the exchange rate at the time the NFT was sold. The inflation adjustment may change, as recent inflation rates are often revised. A list in another currency may be in a slightly different order due to exchange-rate fluctuations. NFTs are listed only once, i.e. for the highest price sold. To maintain a manageable size, only NFTs that were sold for an adjusted price of $2 million and above are listed.

See also

 List of most expensive artworks by living artists
 List of most expensive paintings
 List of most expensive photographs
 List of most expensive sculptures
 List of most expensive books and manuscripts

Notes

References

non-fungible tokens
non-fungible tokens
non-fungible tokens
Ethereum
Most expensive